Callionymus flavus, the yellow ruddertail dragonet, is a species of dragonet endemic to the Red Sea.

References 

F
Fish described in 1983
Taxa named by Ronald Fricke